Fogo is a village in the county of Berwickshire, in the Borders of Scotland, 3 miles south of Duns, on the Blackadder Water.

The name Fogo means "foggage pit, den or hollow" as well as a portmanteau of fog and hollow.

The village contains two Category A listed buildings; the bridge, a single span, round-arched bridge spanning Blackadder Water and the church, founded c.1100 and rebuilt in 1755.

Other places nearby include the Crosshall cross, Gavinton, the Greenknowe Tower, Greenlaw, Edrom, Eccles, Hume Castle, Leitholm, Longformacus, Polwarth, Swinton, and Westruther.

See also
Fogo Priory, Prior of Fogo
List of places in the Scottish Borders
List of places in Scotland

References

External links

Gazetteer for Scotland: Parish of Fogo
RCAHMS/Canmore record for Fogo Bridge
Scottish Borders Council: Fogo Nursery at Fogo Old School
BBC: Coat of arms of Gavinton, Fogo and Polwarth explained
GENUKI: Fogo
Ancestor research at Fogo Parish Churchyard, Berwickshire
History of Fogo Kirk
Old Roads of Scotland: Fogo

Villages in the Scottish Borders
Parishes in Berwickshire